Orwin is a census-designated place located in Porter Township, Schuylkill County in the state of Pennsylvania, United States. Orwin was part of the Reinerton-Orwin-Muir CDP at the 2000 census before splitting into three individual CDPs for the 2010 census.  The other communities, along with Orwin are Reinerton and Muir.  The community is located near the community of Muir along U.S. Route 209.  As of the 2010 census, the population was 314 residents.

Demographics

References

Census-designated places in Schuylkill County, Pennsylvania
Census-designated places in Pennsylvania